Germany at the 2008–2010 European Nations Cup was the first time since 1981 that the German national rugby union team competed at the highest level of FIRA rugby, the European Nations Cup, during 2008-2010.

Germany played ten competition games and two friendlies in its campaign. It lost all ten competition games and, with the exception of the two games against Spain, did so quite clearly, ultimately resulting in Germany's relegation back to the Division 2A for the 2010–12 season. Of the two warm-up friendlies, it lost its match against a Welsh Districts XV, too and managed to win only the game against Hong Kong. A third friendly, against a selection of the British Forces Germany, the British Army Germany rugby union team, had to be postponed twice because of bad weather and was eventually cancelled.

Germany also played two friendlies against Switzerland, to contest the Alpencup, but these games were not counted towards the country's official record as the sides fielded were an under-21 side in 2008 and labelled as Germany A in 2009.

Germany went into its campaign unbeaten at home, having last lost on 12 November 2000, to Ukraine. This record was broken on in its first game on 8 November 2008, when it lost to the Welsh XV.

Background
The 2008-2010 European Nations Cup First Division was the 7th edition of the championship since it was reformed in 2000. The championship not only determined the champions of the ENC but it also acted as an element of European qualification for the 2011 Rugby World Cup in New Zealand.

The top two teams qualified directly to the 2011 Rugby World Cup, and the third-placed entered the European qualification playoffs.

The last placed team in the competition was relegated to the Division 2A.

Management and coaching
At the beginning of Germany's ENC campaign, it was coached by a troika, made up of Rudolf Finsterer, Bruno Stolorz and Mark Kuhlmann, under the supervision of Peter Ianusevici, Germany's Director of Rugby. Kuhlman resigned from his post in March 2009 after over three years of service, without being replaced, while the other two remained in their positions. After losing its tenth and final ENC game, Rudolf Finsterer resigned, having spent ten years as coach of Germany. Finsterer's decision however had been made before the game, and he had informed the team of his decision beforehand, too.

With the international retirement of captain Jens Schmidt in May 2009, Mustafa Güngör became the new captain of the national team with his first game in this position being the one against Hong Kong.

Debuts & retirements
Germany lost a number of players due to retirement during its ENC campaign, usually because most German players are still amateurs and their work commitments don't allow them to continue playing internationally. Along with two former captains, Colin Grzanna and Jens Schmidt, Germany lost two very important players in May 2009. Additionally, Gerrit van Look, Sebastien Chaule and Pierre Faber were all long-term players in the team who terminated their international career.

Partly because of this, Germany fielded a large number of new and young players during its two-year ENC campaign. In the friendly match against Hong Kong alone, eight players made their debut for their country. Anjo Buckman, Daniel Preussner, Mark Sztyndera, Patrick Schliwa, Alexander Hauck, Benjamin Ulrich, Raphael Hackl and Jamie Houston all fielded for Germany for the first time in this game and all have since played for Germany again.

A number of other players also made their debut during the 2008–10 campaign, these being Udo Schwarz, Juan Martin Goity (Wales XV, 2009), Benjamin Brierley, Damien Tussac (Georgia, 2009), Christopher Liebig (Portugal, 2009), Rob Elloway (Russia, 2009), Lukas Hinds-Johnson, Lukas Rosenthal, Guillaume Franke, Shalva Didebashvili, Steffen Liebig (Georgia, 2010), Alexander Metz (Romania, 2010), Fabian Heimpel (Portugal, 2010) and Gilles Pagnon (Russia, 2010).

Christopher Weselek and Michael Poppmeier, two players, returned to the squad after a lengthy absence.

Game locations
Of the seven home games Germany had in this campaign, four were held in Heidelberg and one each in Hanover, Heusenstamm and Berlin. The later was the first game of the German team to be held in the capital in over eight years.

The five away games were in Madrid, Lisbon, Tbilisi, Sochi and Constanţa. The latter was originally scheduled for Bucharest but had to be moved to the Black Sea coast because of bad weather in the Romanian capital, a general issue affecting a number of test matches in early 2010 in Europe.

Table

Table points are determined as follows:
 3 points for a win
 2 points for a draw
 1 point for a loss
 0 points for a forfeit

Games

ENC matches

Friendlies

Player statistics

Squad
The following players were part of the German team during its 2008-10 campaign: 

 Clubs listed are the club or clubs a player played for while playing for Germany in 2008-10, not current club.

Games
The following players have been selected for Germany from 2008 to 2010 in the country's European Nation Cup campaign and in friendlies:

 Number of caps as of end of ENC campaign, 20 March 2010, not overall.
 Bold numbers indicate player played in the game.
 Italics indicates did not play.
  denotes substituted off.
  denotes substituted on.
 (c)  denotes captain.
  denotes sin bin.

Scorers (ENC)

Try scorers

Points scorers

Scorers (Friendlies)

Try scorers

Points scorers

References

External links
 Deutscher Rugby-Verband - Official Site
 TotalRugby.de German rugby website with news and results
 Germany results at scrum.com

2008-10
2008–09 in German rugby union
2009–10 in German rugby union